Marcus Dell Gastineau (born November 20, 1956) is an American former football player who was a defensive end for the New York Jets from 1979 to 1988. A five-time Pro Bowler, he was one of the quickest and most feared pass rushers of his generation; he was the first player to lead the NFL in sacks in consecutive seasons. Gastineau was ranked the 8th greatest pass rusher in National Football League (NFL) history on NFL Network's Top 10 Pass Rushers.

Early life
Gastineau was born in Ardmore, Oklahoma, and moved to Springerville, Arizona at the age of seven, when his parents, Ernie and Lou, bought a ranch. Mark broke his leg as a child in such a horrific manner that he was told by doctors that he would never walk again. Mark overcame the injury against the odds. Ernie built his son a rodeo ring and Mark began entering team-roping events at 12. Mark's other passion was collecting Native American artifacts in Arizona's White Mountains. At Round Valley High School, Gastineau needed urging from his father to play football. Gastineau showed promise, but not enough to attract attention from major colleges.

College
He entered Eastern Arizona Junior College in 1975 and earned All-America honors in his first season. He transferred to Arizona State University, and spent just one season playing defensive end there before finally settling upon East Central Oklahoma State University, now East Central University, in Ada, Oklahoma. He had 27 quarterback sacks in his college career, and earned Outstanding Defensive Lineman honors for the North in the 1979 Senior Bowl.

Gastineau became ECU's first-ever draft pick when the New York Jets selected him in the second round of the 1979 NFL Draft. Connie Carberg, the first female NFL scout in history, was credited with helping the Jets discover Gastineau. The team was coaching in the Senior Bowl and needed another defensive lineman on the roster due to a vacancy, so Carberg called several prospects before suggesting Gastineau to be the replacement based on a phone conversation with him. He was projected to be an eighth round draft pick at the time, but due to his performance in the Senior Bowl and other pre-draft processes, the Jets selected him in the second round.

Professional career
Gastineau was among the most talented and honored defensive linemen of his era. He made the Pro Bowl five straight seasons (1981–1985) and finished his ten-year career with 74 sacks. He was a First-team All-Pro in 1982–1984 and was consensus All-AFC in each of those years.

The "New York Sack Exchange"
In New York, Gastineau was a key part of the famed "New York Sack Exchange," the Jets defensive line that also included Joe Klecko, Marty Lyons and Abdul Salaam. The four combined for 66 sacks in 1981, including twenty by Gastineau (In 1981 sacks were unofficial, but Gastineau's 20 sacks trailed Klecko by only half a sack), to lead the Jets to their first playoff game since 1969. He was Second-team All-Pro in 1981 as well as being consensus All-AFC. In November 1981, he, Klecko, Lyons and Salaam were invited to ring the ceremonial opening bell at the New York Stock Exchange, which served as the inspiration for their nickname.

With Klecko rupturing the patella tendon in his right knee in the second game of the strike shortened 1982 season against the New England Patriots, Gastineau became the new unofficial leader of the "Sack Exchange." Though he was often double teamed, he finished the season with six sacks, and was voted the NFL Defensive Player of the Year by NEA (and awarded the George Halas Trophy). The Jets made the playoffs again in 1982, losing the AFC Championship game to the Miami Dolphins.

Defensive Player of the Year
The 1983 season started with Gastineau and the Jets' first round pick of the 1983 NFL Draft, quarterback Ken O'Brien, being arrested and charged with assault at Studio 54. Despite this off-the-field indiscretion, Gastineau totaled 19 sacks to lead the NFL for the first time.

Gastineau was nationally famous for doing his signature "Sack Dance" after sacking an opposing quarterback. However, he had to stop when the NFL declared it "unsportsmanlike taunting" in March 1984 and began fining players for it. The ban on the dance stemmed from a bench-clearing brawl in the third quarter of a 27–24 overtime win over the Los Angeles Rams at Shea Stadium on September 25, 1983 which began with a sack of Vince Ferragamo by Gastineau who was then shoved from behind by Jackie Slater, the right tackle he had beaten on the play. One month later on October 21, a total of $15,750 in fines was assessed by the NFL against 16 Jets ($7,300) and 21 Rams ($8,450), with Gastineau incurring a $1,000 penalty.

Gastineau had his best individual season with an NFL record 22 sacks (leading the NFL for the second year in a row), 69 tackles and one fumble recovery for a touchdown in 1984. He was voted the UPI AFC Defensive Player of the Year, and was also named MVP of that season's Pro Bowl after tallying four sacks and a safety in that game. Gastineau's sack record stood for 17 years until Michael Strahan broke it in 2001.

New defensive coordinator Bud Carson installed a 3-4 defense for the 1985 season. Gastineau shifted from left defensive end to right defensive end, although he did move him around to allow for mismatches. Gastineau broke his hand early in that season but still finished second in the league with 13½ sacks and was voted All-Pro by the NEA.

The Jets finished 11–5 in 1985 to earn a wildcard spot in the playoffs along with fellow AFC East rivals, the New England Patriots. Gastineau recorded a sack in the Jets' 26–14 loss to the Pats at the Meadowlands.

1986 playoffs
For the start of the 1986 season, Gastineau was featured on the cover of Sports Illustrated alongside New York Giants star linebacker Lawrence Taylor. Injuries limited Gastineau to just two sacks in ten games (his lowest total since his rookie season) as he was slowed by groin and abdominal muscle ailments and then by a damaged left knee that required arthroscopic surgery and forced him to miss the last five games of the regular season.

Gastineau rebounded in the postseason, however, recording a sack in the Jets 35–15 wildcard round victory over the Kansas City Chiefs and  more in the Divisional Round Playoff game against the Cleveland Browns.  Late in the fourth quarter of that game, though, with the Jets leading 20–10 and the Browns facing a second down and 24 from their own 18-yard line, Gastineau was called for a roughing the passer penalty.

The play had originally resulted in an incomplete pass by Browns quarterback Bernie Kosar so instead of having a 3rd-and-24 situation, the 15-yard penalty on Gastineau gave the Browns a first down at their own 33. From there, the Browns drove the remaining 67 yards to a touchdown which cut the Jets' lead to 20–17. The Browns would later tie the game with 7 seconds remaining in regulation on a 22-yard field goal by Mark Moseley and win it on a 27-yard field goal by Moseley 2 minutes and 2 seconds into the second overtime period.

After the game, Gastineau said that he hadn't been guilty of roughing and that he was "just following through." Teammate Marty Lyons, the Jets' other starting defensive end, defended Gastineau saying, "(Ben Dreith) is a referee who's known to take care of the quarterback." Joe Walton, the Jets' head coach would say only, "It was a very key play, Mark was just trying to do the best he could do."

1987 NFL Players' strike
In 1987, Gastineau was the only Jet regular to immediately cross the picket line in that year's players' strike, citing his need to pay alimony. Teammate Dave Jennings said of this understandably unpopular move: "We expected it from Mark. He's always put himself in front of the team."  The crossing brought to a head longstanding tensions between Gastineau and his teammates; he had never been popular in the locker room. Gastineau got into a fight with backup center Guy Bingham when he drove into the Jets complex early in the strike. Gastineau was later joined in crossing the picket line by teammates Marty Lyons and Joe Klecko, further undermining the players' strike.

Retirement

Gastineau led the AFC in sacks seven weeks into the 1988 season. He then abruptly  announced his retirement soon after Brigitte Nielsen, to whom he had previously announced his engagement, claimed to be suffering from cancer of the uterus. The announcement was followed by a surge of investigation by local New York papers of whether she was telling the truth, reflecting citywide mistrust of Gastineau. At the time of his retirement, Gastineau was the NFL's all-time leader in sacks.

Gastineau attempted a comeback with the BC Lions of the Canadian Football League in 1990, but was released after only four games.

Gastineau was inducted into the New York Jets Ring of Honor on October 8, 2012.

NFL career statistics

 Sacks were not an official stat until 1982

Boxing
In 1991, Gastineau began a career in boxing, lasting five years. In his first fight, Gastineau knocked out Derrick Dukes in the first round. Dukes, a professional wrestler, later admitted he took a dive. TV newsmagazine show 60 Minutes interviewed several others that fought Gastineau and were told to take dives to make Gastineau look good. His career ended in 1996 when he lost to another former football player, Alonzo Highsmith.  In 18 career bouts, his record in boxing was 15 wins, two losses, and one no-contest.

Personal life
Gastineau has been married three times. His first wife, Lisa Gastineau and their daughter Brittny Gastineau starred in the E! reality television show, The Gastineau Girls. Gastineau has a son with actress Brigitte Nielsen, Killian Marcus. He was estranged from both children in 2010.

Shortly after his release from prison in 2001, Gastineau claimed he had put his turbulent past behind him after he had a religious conversion to faith in Jesus Christ. Gastineau has appeared on programs such as The 700 Club to speak of his experience. Gastineau is a member of the choir at Times Square Church, where he married third wife JoAnn in 2007.

Legal issues
In 1984, Gastineau was found guilty of assaulting a patron at Studio 54. He was sentenced to 90 hours of community service, teaching football to inmates at Rikers Island.

In 1991, Gastineau was arrested for picking up a package of amphetamine pills at Phoenix Sky Harbor Airport. He was sentenced to three years probation in 1993.

In September, 2000, Gastineau was sentenced to 18 months in jail after failing to complete an anger management course after hitting his second wife, Patricia.

Health
In 2016, Gastineau was diagnosed with dementia, Parkinson's disease, and Alzheimer's disease. Gastineau said he believed the illnesses could be traced back to football, stating he wanted to continue to teach younger football players how to play the game safely. He blames the brain diseases on poor tackling technique.

In March 2019, Gastineau revealed that he had been battling colon cancer.

References

External links
 

1956 births
Living people
American football defensive ends
American players of Canadian football
Canadian football defensive linemen
Arizona State Sun Devils football players
BC Lions players
Eastern Arizona Gila Monsters football players
East Central Tigers football players
New York Jets players
American Conference Pro Bowl players
People from Ardmore, Oklahoma
Players of American football from Arizona
Players of American football from Oklahoma
People with Alzheimer's disease
People with Parkinson's disease
People from Springerville, Arizona
American male boxers
Boxers from Oklahoma
Heavyweight boxers